IV may refer to:

Businesses and organizations

In the United States
Immigration Voice, an activist organization
Intellectual Ventures, a privately held intellectual property company
InterVarsity Christian Fellowship

Elsewhere
Federation of Austrian Industries
Irish Volunteers, a military organization
Italia Viva, an Italian centrist political party

Music
Subdominant, in music theory

Recordings
IV (The Aggrolites album), 2009
IV (Angband album), 2020
IV (BadBadNotGood album), 2016
IV (Black Mountain album), 2016
IV (Cypress Hill album), 1998
IV (Diamond Rio album), 1996
IV (Goatsnake album), 1998
IV (Godsmack album), 2006
IV (Hiroyuki Sawano album), 2021
I.V. (Loma Prieta album), 2012
IV (Maylene and the Sons of Disaster album), 2011
IV (Ton Steine Scherben album), 1981
IV (The Stranglers album), 1980
IV (To/Die/For album), 2004
IV (Veruca Salt album), 2006
IV (Winger album), 2006
IV (Željko Joksimović album), 2005
Faust IV, 1973
Good Apollo, I'm Burning Star IV, Volume One: From Fear Through the Eyes of Madness, by Coheed and Cambria, 2005
Led Zeppelin IV, 1971
Toto IV, 1982
IV (EP), a 2013 EP by The 1975
"I.V." (song), by X Japan, 2008
IV, a 1990 EP by The Lookouts

Places
Ivory Coast, a country in West Africa
IV postcode area, north Scotland
Isla Vista, California, United States

In science, technology and mathematics
Intravenous therapy, a route of administration of a drug
I–V curve, current–voltage curve characteristic
Implied volatility, a term in financial mathematics
Independent variable, in mathematical and statistical modeling
Independent verification systems, in voting machines
Initialization vector, in cryptography
Instrumental variable, in statistics
Intrinsic value (finance), of an option or stock
Intrinsic viscosity
Trochlear nerve, the fourth cranial nerve

Other uses
4 (number) in Roman numerals
International Viewpoint, an online magazine of the Trotskyist reunified Fourth International
Inter vivos trust, a legal instrument

See also
4 (disambiguation)